Big World Café is a music show on British television.  Broadcast on Channel 4 in 1989, it was presented by Mariella Frostrup, Eagle Eye Cherry and Jazzie B.

It was produced by Andrea Wonfor, who had previously worked on The Tube. 

During the programme's second series, Andy Kershaw was recruited to report on world music.

Artists who appeared on the show included Les Négresses Vertes, New Order, Prefab Sprout, They Might Be Giants and Wet Wet Wet.

External links
 
 Big World Café on Sidereel

Channel 4 original programming
1989 British television series debuts
1989 British television series endings
1980s British music television series
Pop music television series
English-language television shows